The  flows through Aichi Prefecture, Japan. It is an artificial river, which was dug in the Edo period. It flows through the regions of: Kitanagoya, Kiyosu, Ama, Ōharu, Nagoya.

References

Rivers of Aichi Prefecture
Geography of Nagoya
Rivers of Japan